Avshalomov (masculine) or Avshalomova (feminine) is a Russian surname. Notable people with the surname include:

Aaron Avshalomov (1894–1965), Russian composer
Hizgil Avshalumov (1913-2001), soviet novelist, poet and playwright.
Jacob Avshalomov (1919–2013), American composer and conductor
David Avshalomov (1946-), American classical composer, vocalist, and conductor.

Russian-language surnames